Michael Sloan is an American freelance illustrator. In 2018, he won the Pulitzer Prize for Editorial Cartooning along with Jake Halpern, for their comic Welcome to the New World. In 2020, Halpern and Sloan published a graphic novel under the same name.  A musician as well as visual artist, Sloan writes and records songs which can be streamed on Spotify.

References

External links

Welcome to the New World at The New York Times
 at Spotify

Living people
American cartoonists
Pulitzer Prize for Editorial Cartooning winners
Year of birth missing (living people)
Rhode Island School of Design alumni